Lithium azide is the lithium salt of hydrazoic acid. It is an unstable and toxic compound that decomposes into lithium and nitrogen when heated.

Preparation
It can be prepared by metathesis reaction between sodium azide and lithium nitrate or lithium sulfate solutions:

It can also be prepared by reacting lithium sulfate with barium azide.

References

Lithium salts
Azides